Oreolalax multipunctatus (dotted lazy toad or spotted toothed toad) is a species of amphibian in the family Megophryidae. It is endemic to the Mount Emei region in Emeishan and Hongya counties of Sichuan, China.
Its natural habitats are subtropical moist montane forests and rivers.
It is threatened by habitat loss.

References

multipunctatus
Amphibians of China
Endemic fauna of Sichuan
Taxonomy articles created by Polbot
Amphibians described in 1993
Taxa named by Zhao Ermi